A cloister is a covered walkway with an open colonnade on one side that faces a quadrangle or garth.

Cloister or cloisters may also refer to:
A monastery or monastic life, especially cloistered or enclosed religious orders
The Cloisters (disambiguation)
Cloister Inn, one of the undergraduate eating clubs at Princeton University
Cloister (cocktail), a gin-based cocktail
Cloister (typeface), a serif typeface

See also
 Cloyster, a Pokémon